Osa is a town and the administrative center of Osinsky District in Perm Krai, Russia, located on the left bank of the Kama River near its confluence with the Tulva,  southwest of Perm, the administrative center of the krai. As of the 2010 Census, its population was 21,188.

History
It was founded in 1591 (according to other sources—in 1596) as the sloboda of Novonikolskaya and later became a fortress. In a 1623 document, the settlement is referred to as the sloboda of Osinskaya Nikolskaya, in 1678—as the sloboda of Osinskaya, in 1732—as the village (selo) of Osa. It was granted town status in 1739. In 1960, oil fields were discovered near Osa. Oil extraction started in 1963.

Administrative and municipal status
Within the framework of administrative divisions, Osa serves as the administrative center of Osinsky District, to which it is directly subordinated. As a municipal division, the town of Osa, together with five rural localities, is incorporated within Osinsky Municipal District as Osinskoye Urban Settlement.

Demographics

References

Notes

Sources

Cities and towns in Perm Krai
Osinsky District, Perm Krai
Osinsky Uyezd
Populated places established in the 1590s
Populated places on the Kama River